Winton Academy is an all-boys secondary school located in Bournemouth, Dorset, England. The school was founded in 1877 and was expanded on a restricted site until 1995 when it moved to its present site. Originally named Winton Boys' School the school then changed its name to Winton School and then again to Winton Arts and Media College. After converting to academy status in 2013 the school was 
renamed Winton Academy.

The school is situated next to Glenmoor Academy for girls, and the two schools are linked as part of the United Learning trust.

References 

Boys' schools in Dorset
Educational institutions established in 1877
Schools in Bournemouth
1877 establishments in England
Secondary schools in Bournemouth, Christchurch and Poole
Academies in Bournemouth, Christchurch and Poole
United Learning schools